St. Joseph Township is the name of some places in the U.S. state of Minnesota:
St. Joseph Township, Kittson County, Minnesota
St. Joseph Township, Stearns County, Minnesota

See also

 St. Joseph Township (disambiguation)

Minnesota township disambiguation pages